Fernando Ortiz (born 1905, date of death unknown) was a Mexican sprinter from Baja California. He competed in the men's 100 metres at the 1932 Summer Olympics in Los Angeles.

References

1905 births
Year of death missing
Athletes (track and field) at the 1932 Summer Olympics
Mexican male sprinters
Olympic athletes of Mexico
Place of birth missing
20th-century Mexican people